This is a list of defunct airlines of Nicaragua.

See also
 List of airlines of Nicaragua
 List of airports in Nicaragua

References

Nicaragua
Airlines
Airlines, defunct
Airlines